Communication is the third studio album by American musician Bobby Womack. The album was released on September 15, 1971, by United Artists Records. It reached No. 5 on the Billboard R&B chart and No. 20 on the Billboard Jazz Chart in 1972. It included the hit single, "That's The Way I Feel About Cha", which charted at No. 2 on the Billboard R&B Singles chart and No. 27 on the Billboard pop chart. The album became Womack's breakthrough spawning the hit single "That's The Way I Feel About Cha" and a favorite Womack album track, "(If You Don't Want My Love) Give It Back", which Womack recorded three times after the original, the first remake, a slower acoustic version, was issued on the soundtrack of the film, Across 110th Street, and an instrumental by J. J. Johnson's band. The fourth time Womack recorded it was with Rolling Stones singer and musician Ron Wood. Womack recorded his own versions of James Taylor's "Fire and Rain", Ray Stevens' "Everything Is Beautiful" and featured a spoken word monologue in his cover of the Burt Bacharach and Hal David standard, "(They Long To Be) Close to You".

Actress Pam Grier and veteran singers Janice Singleton and Patrice Holloway sung background on the songs "Come l'Amore", "Give It Back" and "Yield Not to Temptation", a song Womack and his brothers, The Womack Brothers (later The Valentinos), recorded over a decade before with Bobby's older brother Curtis singing lead. Ironically, Bobby's brothers sing background with him on the remaining tracks. The album's instrumental background was provided by the legendary Muscle Shoals team. The track "Come l'Amore" was "covered" by James Brown in his Lyn Collins duet single, "What My Baby Needs Now (Is A Little More Loving)" though the lyrics are different and in different keys.

Track listing

Personnel 
Bobby Womack – vocals, guitar, organ, string and horn arrangements 
Barry Beckett – piano, clavichord, harpsichord, electric piano, Moog synthesizer
Jimmy Johnson, Tippy Armstrong – guitar
Roger Hawkins – drums, percussion
David Hood – bass
Truman Thomas, Clayton Ivey – keyboards
Harrison Calloway – trumpet
Dale Quillen – trombone
Ronnie Eades – baritone saxophone
Harvey Thompson – tenor saxophone
Friendly Womack, Jr., Curtis Womack, Harry Womack, Cecil Womack, Patrice Holloway, Pam Grier, Janice Singleton – backing vocals
René Hall - string arrangements
Technical
John Van Hamersveld - art direction
Norman Seeff - photography

Charts

Singles

References

1971 albums
Bobby Womack albums
United Artists Records albums
Albums arranged by René Hall
Albums produced by Bobby Womack